Sophie Troc is a French alpine skier, sighted guide and 3-time Paralympic Champion.

She was Nicolas Berejny's sighted guide at Turin 2006 and Vancouver 2010.

They competed in the 2006 Winter Paralympics in Turin, Italy, and won gold in the Slalom and the Giant Slalom, visually impaired, and bronze in the Downhill, visually impaired.

At the 2010 Winter Paralympics in Vancouver, British Columbia, Canada, Troc and Berejny won gold in the Super-G, visually impaired.

References

 Photo: Nicolas Berejny, Sophie Troc – Paralympic Winter Games: Day Seven, Life magazine
 

Living people
French female alpine skiers
Paralympic sighted guides
Paralympic alpine skiers of France
Alpine skiers at the 2010 Winter Paralympics
Paralympic gold medalists for France
Paralympic bronze medalists for France
Year of birth missing (living people)
Paralympic medalists in alpine skiing
Medalists at the 2006 Winter Paralympics
Medalists at the 2010 Winter Paralympics